Sándor Rozsnyói (born Sándor Rosner, 24 November 1930 – 2 September 2014) was a Hungarian athlete, who mainly competed in the 3,000-metre steeple chase.

Born in Zalaegerszeg, he competed for Hungary at the 1956 Summer Olympics held in Melbourne, Australia, where he won the silver medal in the men's 3000 m steeplechase.

Rozsnyói absconded from the plane on his return trip to Hungary and became a refugee in Vienna, Austria, as the Soviet Union had invaded Hungary. His wife managed to escape to Austria and reunite with him.  After working in Vienna for 7 years, the family migrated to Sydney, Australia.  Rozsnyói became a physical education teacher in New South Wales, teaching at Epping Boys High School, Cumberland High School and Model Farms High School, and was a coach with the Ryde-Hornsby Athletic Club.

Rozsnyói lived for much of his life in Epping, NSW, with his wife and sons Alex and Les.

In 2007, he was awarded the International Fair Play Award for the sportsmanship he displayed when he chose not to challenge the outcome of his 1956 Olympic  Steeplechase race.

References

Sources
 Sportlexikon II. (L–Z). Főszerk. Nádori László. Budapest: Sport. 1986.  
 Rózsaligeti László: Magyar olimpiai lexikon. Budapest: Datus. 2000.  
 Révai új lexikona XVI. (Rac–Sy). Főszerk. Kollega Tarsoly István. Szekszárd: Babits. 2005.  

Rozsnyói on melbourne56.origo.hu 
Profile on nssz.hu 
szentkoronaradio.com: Interview with Rozsnyói about the olympic final 

1930 births
2014 deaths
Hungarian male long-distance runners
Athletes (track and field) at the 1956 Summer Olympics
Olympic athletes of Hungary
Olympic silver medalists for Hungary
World record setters in athletics (track and field)
Hungarian male steeplechase runners
European Athletics Championships medalists
Medalists at the 1956 Summer Olympics
Olympic silver medalists in athletics (track and field)
People from Zalaegerszeg
Sportspeople from Zala County
20th-century Hungarian people